Modern versions of the Chinese language have two kinds of punctuation marks for indicating proper nouns – the proper name mark / proper noun mark (Simplified Chinese: 专名号; Traditional Chinese: 專名號) and the book title marks / title marks (Simplified Chinese: 书名号; Traditional Chinese: 書名號). The former may be applied to all proper nouns except when the nouns in question are titles of textual or artistic works, in which case the latter are used instead. The book title marks come in different forms while the proper name mark does not – given that their rotated forms are not counted separately.

Old-school style

Horizontally-aligned text
This style uses two different underlines. The proper name mark appears as a straight underline (No dedicated stand-alone digital characters are available yet…) while the book title mark appears as a wavy underline (﹏).

Example
放逐，乃賦離騒。失明，厥有國語。 (In case there are display errors on your device... '離騷' and '國語' are both supposed to be wavy-underlined.) 

Translation: Qu Yuan was exiled, the Li Sao was thus composed . Zuo Qiu (or Zuoqiu) lost his sight, hence there is the Guo Yu.

Vertically-aligned text
In this case, on-the-left beside-lines (︳) and (︴) are used instead of underlines.

Current Status
When a proper noun immediately follows another, the lines accompanying each of them do not connect; many digital systems are unable to display this correctly.

The use of this style is common only in Traditional Chinese school textbooks and modernly-laid-out Classical Chinese text.

Popular styles

Horizontally-aligned text
This style only uses a pair of guillemets (《》) and a pair of angle brackets (〈〉) as book title marks to precede and succede each proper noun which is the title of a piece of textual or artistic work, no punctuation marks are used for other proper nouns.

Example

Vertically-aligned text
In this case, the rotated forms of the above-mentioned symbols (︽︾) and (︿﹀) are used instead of them.

Current status
Since those symbols are processed as individual characters instead of mark-ups on other characters, there are virtually no difficulties for digital systems to display them correctly. 

These styles are dominant amongst both printed and digital Chinese text. In Taiwan's Traditional Chinese, the guillemets and angle brackets are chosen according to the format of the textual or artistic work – in general, the formers are for those that would be italicized if they were in English text; the latter are for those that would be in quotations if they were in English text. In Mainland China's Simplified Chinese, guillemets are used regardless of the work's type – angle brackets only appear between them to indicate a title within another title. In Hong Kong and Macao, the governments adopt the Mainland China standard on the usage of all punctuation marks even when the characters are in Traditional Chinese, but otherwise, the Taiwan standard is widely adopted.

See also
Interpunct, used to mark divisions in proper names in Chinese
Tai tou, an honorific space sometimes inserted before a person's name as a mark of respect

References

Notes

Chinese characters
Typography
Names
zh-yue:固有名詞#標點符號